, or KGWU, is a private university in Abiko, Chiba, Japan, established in 1988. The predecessor of the school was founded in 1924.

Alumni 
 Kyōko Hasegawa, an actress, fashion model

External links
 Official website 

Educational institutions established in 1924
Private universities and colleges in Japan
Universities and colleges in Chiba Prefecture
Abiko, Chiba
1924 establishments in Japan
Women's universities and colleges in Japan